Federico Dionisi (born 16 June 1987) is an Italian footballer. He plays as a striker for Serie B team Ascoli.

Career
Dionisi started his career at non-professional team Monterotondo. He also spent 1 season at Messina's youth team. A native of Lazio, he moved to Rome which is both the capital of Lazio and Italy, for Cisco Roma of Serie C2. In January 2007, he moved to Abruzzo for Celano. He played 15 league matches in his first professional season, including one in playoffs.

Livorno
On 2 January 2009, Dionisi agreed to join Livorno after some good performances with Celano and Monterotondo. He was presented by Livorno on 2 July with other news players of Livorno, Francesco Di Bella and Cristian Raimondi. He scored his first official goal with Livorno on 14 August against Torino in Coppa Italia. Livorno won the match for 2–0.

In September 2013, he signed a one-year loan deal with Olhanense.

Frosinone
On 28 July 2014, Dionisi signed permanently with Frosinone. He helped Frosinone gain promotion to Serie A for the 2015–16 season. He scored his first Serie A goal on 28 September 2015 in the 58th minute and then scored a second in the 71st minute in a 2–0 home win against Empoli.

Ascoli 
On 24 January 2021, Dionisi signed a 2.5-year contract for Serie B team Ascoli.

References

External links
 

Living people
1987 births
People from Rieti
Footballers from Lazio
Association football forwards
Italian footballers
Italian expatriate footballers
Pol. Monterotondo Lupa players
Atletico Roma F.C. players
A.C.R. Messina players
U.S. Livorno 1915 players
S.C. Olhanense players
Frosinone Calcio players
Ascoli Calcio 1898 F.C. players
Serie A players
Serie B players
Primeira Liga players
Expatriate footballers in Portugal
Italian expatriate sportspeople in Portugal
Sportspeople from the Province of Rieti